Sahar Khalifeh (born 1941) is a Palestinian writer. She has written eleven novels, which have been translated into English, French, Hebrew, German, Spanish, and many other languages. One of her best-known works is the novel Wild Thorns (1976). She has won numerous international prizes, including the 2006 Naguib Mahfouz literature medal for The Image, the Icon, and the Covenant.

Biography
Sahar Khalifeh was born in Nablus, Palestine, the fifth of eight girls in her family. Khalifeh reflects “I learned that I was a member of a miserable, useless, worthless sex. From childhood, I was taught to prepare myself for the risks associated with being a woman.” In childhood, Khalifeh found creative outlets like reading, writing, and painting. She was married off against her will shortly after finishing high school in Amman. She describes her 13-year marriage as “miserable and devastating” and did not write during this period. She once again found refuge in books: “I indulged, just like anybody else in the educated Arab world, in the existentialist movement and existential intellectualism. Until the Occupation took place, I continued to be an existentialist.”

After the 1967 defeat and subsequent occupation of the West Bank, Khalifeh began writing again. She began with “resistance poetry”, inspired by the works of Mahmoud Darwish before breaking from the limited female narratives typical in resistance literature. Her first novel, After the Defeat, followed the interactions of families in a Nablus apartment building after the war. The only manuscript of this novel was confiscated by Israeli authorities and never published. Khalifeh continued writing and her first novel, We Are Not Your Slaves Any Longer, was published in 1974, followed by her best-known novel in 1976. Wild Thorns explored class nuances under Israeli occupation. She published The Sunflower in 1980 as a sequel to Wild Thorns to focus on female narratives that were largely absent from the original story.  

Khalifeh obtained her Bachelor of Arts degree in English from Birzeit University. In her autobiography, A Novel for My Story, she describes beginning life as a University student at the age of thirty-two alongside two other middle-aged friends from Nablus. She continued her education in the U.S., receiving a Fulbright scholarship to complete her MA in English from the University in North Carolina Chapel Hill. She received her Ph.D. in Women’s studies and American literature from the University of Iowa. She returned to Nablus in 1988 after the start of the first intifada and began writing Bab al-Saha (Passage to the Plaza), a novel depicting women’s lives against the background of the Intifada. In 1988 Khalifeh also founded the Women’s Affairs Center in Nablus. She describes her work with women in Nablus in an interview with Penny Johnson “I didn't bring an image of an institution from abroad. I learned from ‘reality.’” Khalifeh has since opened Women’s Affairs Center branches in Gaza City, West Bank, and Amman, Jordan.

Sahar Khalifeh has continued writing, one of her recent publications أصلٌ وفصل (Root and Branch) was published in 2009 by Dar al-Adeb and translated into English as Of Noble Origins in 2012. This novel, set at the eve of Israel’s establishment, explores the stories of characters confronting the British Mandate and the Zionist movement. Khalifeh’s most recent publication of 2010 My First and Only Love follows the story of a Palestinian woman who, after many years in exile, returns home to Nablus. This novel was published in English by Hoopoe in March 2021. To date, Sahar Khalifeh has published eleven novels, all of which deal with the situation of the Palestinians under occupation.

Selected works

Publications by Khalifeh
The following novels are available in translation into English:
The End of Spring (Interlink)
The Inheritance (American University in Cairo Press)
Of Noble Origins (AUC Press)
The Image, the Icon and the Covenant (Interlink)
Wild Thorns (Saqi)
Passage to the Plaza (Seagull Books)
My First and Only Love (Hoopoe)
Other novels not translated into English:

 Abbad al-Shams The Sunflower (Dar al-Adab)
 Rabi’ Harr Hot Spring (Dar al-Adab)
 Mudhakkirāt imra’ah ghayr wāqi’īyah Memoirs of an Unrealistic Woman (Dar al-Adab)
 Lam na’ud ghawārī lakum We Are not Your Slave Girls Anymore (Dar al-Adab)

Publications with contributions by Khalifeh
Anthology of Modern Palestinian Literature by Salma Jayyusi (Columbia University Press), contains excerpts of her earlier work

Awards
2006: Naguib Mahfouz Medal for Literature for The Image, the Icon, and the Covenant.
2013: The Mohamed Zafzaf Prize, Morocco

References

External links 
Bio-bibliography (in French) on the site Samed devoted to palestinian literature
Arab World Books
al-Mallah, Ahmad. "Sahar Khalifa." Twentieth-Century Arabic Writers. Dictionary of Literary Biography Vol. 346. Gale, 2009. Literature Resource Center. Gale. 17 Mar. 2009 Gale Literature Resource Center
Who Is Hidden beneath the Burqa? An Appeal to the West by Sahar Khalifa

1942 births
Living people
Palestinian feminists
Palestinian women writers
Feminist writers
People from Nablus
Recipients of the Naguib Mahfouz Medal for Literature
Birzeit University alumni
University of North Carolina at Chapel Hill alumni
University of Iowa alumni
International Writing Program alumni
Palestinian novelists
21st-century Palestinian women writers
21st-century Palestinian writers
20th-century Palestinian women writers
20th-century Palestinian writers
Fulbright alumni